The fire-eyes, Pyriglena, are a genus of birds in the antbird family Thamnophilidae.The genus contains 5 species, all found in South America. The fire-eyes are 16–18 cm in length, weigh 25-36 g and have characteristic red eyes that give them their name. They have sexually dimorphic plumage, with the females possessing brown to buff coloured bodies with black tails, and the males being black with small patches of white on the back or wings. The fire-eyes eat a variety of insects, and will regularly follow army ants in order to catch prey flushed by them. Two of the fire-eyes are widespread and safe, but one species, the fringe-backed fire-eye, is threatened with extinction.

Taxonomy and systematics
The genus Pyriglena was introduced by the German ornithologist Jean Cabanis in 1847. The name is from the Ancient Greek word puriglēnos meaning fiery-eyed. The type species is the white-shouldered fire-eye.

The genus contains 5 species:
 Western fire-eye (Pyriglena maura)
 Tapajos fire-eye (Pyriglena similis)
 Fringe-backed fire-eye (Pyriglena atra)
 East Amazonian fire-eye (Pyriglena leuconota)
 White-shouldered fire-eye (Pyriglena leucoptera)
The 5 species of fire-eye have sometimes been treated as a single species. A study published in 2017 recommended that the white-backed fire-eye should be spit into three separate species.

References

 
Taxonomy articles created by Polbot